Cesare Paoli (1840–1902), Italian historian and paleographer, was the son of senator Baldassare Paoli. He was born and educated in Florence where at 21 he was given an appointment in the record office. From 1865 to 1871 he was attached to the archives of Siena, but eventually returned to Florence. In 1874 he was appointed first professor of palaeography and diplomatics at the Istituto di Studii Superiori in Florence, where he continued to work at the interpretation of manuscripts. In 1887 he became editor of the Archivio storico italiano, contributing numerous articles. His works consist of many historical essays, studies on palaeography, transcriptions of state and other papers, reviews, etc.

References

External links

 

1840 births
1902 deaths
19th-century Italian historians
Writers from Florence